Neoeromene is a genus of moths of the family Crambidae.

Species

References

Natural History Museum Lepidoptera genus database

Diptychophorini
Crambidae genera